The Central District of Bileh Savar County is in Ardabil province, Iran. At the 2006 census, its population was 29,786 in 6,438 households. The following census in 2011 counted 30,920 people in 8,082 households. At the latest census in 2016, the district had 29,111 inhabitants living in 8,722 households.

References 

Bileh Savar County

Districts of Ardabil Province

Populated places in Ardabil Province

Populated places in Bileh Savar County